Tate & Lyle PLC is a British-headquartered, global supplier of food and beverage ingredients to industrial markets. It was originally a sugar refining business, but from the 1970s, it began to diversify, eventually divesting its sugar business in 2010. It specialises in turning raw materials such as corn and tapioca into ingredients that add taste, texture, and nutrients to food and beverages. It is listed on the London Stock Exchange and is a constituent of the FTSE 250 Index.

History

Sugar refining 

The company was formed in 1921 from a merger of two rival sugar refiners: Henry Tate & Sons and Abram Lyle & Sons.

Henry Tate established his business in 1859, in Liverpool, later expanding to Silvertown in East London. He used his industrial fortune to found the Tate Institute in Silvertown in 1887, and the Tate Gallery in Pimlico, Central London in 1897. He endowed the gallery with his own collection of Pre-Raphaelite paintings.

Abram Lyle, a cooper and shipowner, acquired an interest in a sugar refinery in 1865, in Greenock and then at Plaistow Wharf, West Silvertown, London. The two companies had large factories nearby each other – Henry Tate in Silvertown and Abram Lyle at Plaistow Wharf – so prompting the merger. Prior to the merger, which occurred after they had died, the two men were bitter business rivals, although they had never met in person. In 1949, the company introduced its "Mr Cube" brand, as part of a marketing campaign to help it fight a proposed nationalisation by the Labour government.

Diversification 
From 1973, British membership of the European Economic Community threatened Tate & Lyle's core business, with quotas imposed from Brussels favouring domestic sugar beet producers over imported cane refiners such as Tate & Lyle. As a result, under the leadership of Saxon Tate (a direct descendant of Henry Tate), the company began to diversify into related fields of commodity trading, transport and engineering, and in 1976, it acquired competing cane sugar refiner Manbré & Garton.

In 1976, the Company acquired a 33% stake (increased to 63% in 1988) in Amylum, a European starch-based manufacturing business. The Liverpool sugar plant closed in 1981, and the Greenock plant closed in 1997. In 1988, Tate & Lyle acquired a 90% stake in A. E. Staley, a US corn processing business. In 1998 it brought Haarmann & Reimer, a citric acid producer. In 2000, it acquired the remaining minorities of Amylum and A. E. Staley.

In 2004, it established a joint venture with DuPont to manufacture a renewable 1,3-Propanediol that can be used to make Sorona (a substitute for nylon). This was its first major foray into bio-materials. In 2005, DuPont Tate & Lyle BioProducts was created as a joint venture between DuPont and Tate & Lyle. In 2006, it acquired Hycail, a small Dutch business, giving the company intellectual property and a pilot plant to manufacture Polylactic acid (PLA), another bio-plastic. In October 2007, five European starch and alcohol plants, previously part of the European starch division known as Amylum group, were sold to Syral, a subsidiary of French sugar company Tereos. Syral closed its Greenwich Peninsula plant in London in September 2009, and it was subsequently demolished.

In 2006, Lyle’s Golden Syrup tin was awarded a Guinness World Record as the world’s oldest branding.

In February 2008, it was announced that Tate & Lyle granulated white cane sugar would be accredited as a Fairtrade product, with all the company's other retail products to follow in 2009.

In April 2009, the United States International Trade Commission affirmed a ruling that Chinese manufacturers can make copycat versions of its Splenda product.

In 2021, Tate & Lyle ranked fourth in the Modified Starch category of FoodTalks' Global Food Thickener Companies list.

In May 2022, it was announced that Tate & Lyle had acquired Nutriati, an ingredient technology company developing and producing chickpea protein and flour.

Disposal of sugar refining business 
In July 2010, the company announced the sale of its sugar refining business, including rights to use the Tate & Lyle brand name and Lyle's Golden Syrup, to American Sugar Refining (owned by sugar barons the Fanjul brothers) for £211 million. The sale included the Plaistow Wharf and Silvertown plants. The new owners pledged that there would be no job losses as a result of the transaction.

Recent history 
In 2012, HarperCollins published The Sugar Girls, a work of narrative non-fiction based on the true stories of women who worked at Tate & Lyle's two factories in the East End of London from the 1940s to the 1960s.

Nick Hampton became CEO on 1 April 2018, replacing Javed Ahmed, who stepped down from this role and from the board, and retired from the company.

Tate & Lyle has developed a method to commercially produce the natural sweetener allulose. It emerged in August 2019 that the company was seeking to take advantage of the 2019 permission from the U.S. Food and Drug Administration to not list the product in total sugar or as an added sugar in commercial food ingredients.

In July 2021, Tate & Lyle announced it was spinning off Tate & Lyle Primary Products (formerly, A. E. Staley) into a new company to be known as Primary Products Ingredients Americas LLC (Primient). Tate & Lyle will maintain 50% ownership of Primient and the remaining 50% will be owned by KPS Capital Partners (including board and management control). The transaction was completed in April 2022.

In June 2022, it was announced that Tate & Lyle had completed the acquisition of Quantum Hi-Tech (Guangdong) Biological Co., Ltd (Quantum), a prebiotic dietary fibre business located in China.

In January 2023, Tate & Lyle announced a rebrand, including a new logo and typography, new imagery and a new narrative: science, solutions, society.

Operations 

The company is organised as follows:
 Sweeteners, such as Splenda (sucralose), crystalline fructose, and allulose
 Texturants, such as starch and gums
 Health and wellness ingredients, such as dietary fibres
 Stabilisers and functional systems

Controversies 
In September 2022, starch supplied by Tate & Lyle PLC was identified as the possible source of the contaminant that led to the death of Celia Marsh in Bath in 2017, shortly after eating supposedly dairy-free yoghurt used in a Pret a Manger wrap. The yoghurt contained a stabiliser called HG1 designed by Australian company CoYo founder Henry Gosling with Tate & Lyle’s Australian subsidiary. From 2012, yoghurt using HG1 manufactured by Tate & Lyle’s plant in north Wales was supplied as "dairy-free" to Pret a Manger despite the HG1 bags from Tate & Lyle stating: “Manufactured in a factory that handles milk, eggs, cereals.”

See also 
 Primient, American subsidiary
 Splenda, sugar substitute
 Redpath Sugar, former subsidiary

References

Further reading 
  – A source for information concerning T&L's union-busting activities in the early 1990s in Decatur, Illinois
 Sugar and All That... A History of TATE & LYLE by Antony Hugill (Gentry Books, 1978)  
 Tate & Lyle PLC and Ferruzzi Finanziaria SpA and S & W Berisford PLC, 1987 Competition Commission report
 Tate & Lyle PLC and British Sugar plc, 1991 Competition Commission report

External links 

 Tate & Lyle corporate website
 
 The history of sugar in Liverpool and the effects of the closure of the Tate & Lyle sugar refinery
 The house of William Park Lyle, son of Abram Lyle, has had a multi million makeover
 The Sugar Girls official website
 

 
British Royal Warrant holders
Food manufacturers of the United Kingdom
Companies listed on the London Stock Exchange
Food processing in London
British brands
Sugar companies
Starch companies
Port of London
Industry on the River Thames
Manufacturing companies based in Liverpool
1921 establishments in England
British companies established in 1921
Food and drink companies established in 1921
Sugar industry in the United Kingdom
Companies based in the City of Westminster